Albert Keneth Mangweha (November 16, 1982 - May 28, 2013) who used aliases; Ngwair, Mangwea, Mangwair, and Ngwea was a Tanzanian hip hop artist predominantly known for his freestyle punchlines and hardcore rap style.

Early life
Mangweha was born on November 16, 1982 in Mbeya, Tanzania as the 10th and the youngest child of his family. He attended at Mazengo Technical College.

Music career
Mangweha's career started back in 2003 when he released his first track 'Ghetto langu,' produced by P. Funk Majani. In 2004, released his first ever album, 'AKA MIMI' that is considered one of Tanzanian's best Hip hop albums of all time. He won the Tanzania Music Awards as the Best Hip Hop artist the same year.

Discography

ALBUMS
2004: AKA MIMI
2009: N'GE 1982

SINGLES
CNN ft Fid Q
Mapenzi gani ft Lady Jaydee
Aminia feat Inspecta Haruni, Mwana FA
Birthday N'GE ft Mwasiti, TID & Mez B
Speed 120 ft Chid Beenz
TZ Hustler ft J-Son
She performs ft TID
Mafia ft. Jay Moe
Bado nimo
Salamu
Mademu wangu
Mida mibovu ft Juma Nature, Ferooz, P. Funk Majani, Dark Master & Jay Moe
Kimya Kimya
Nipe deal
Singida Dodoma ft Dully Sykes
Alikufa kwa ngoma
Napokea simu
Weekend
Sikiliza
Wife
Tupo juu ft Squeezer & Steve RNB
Ghetto langu
Clubbin'
She got a Gwan

Controversial death
Mangweha was touring South Africa when he was found unconscious in his room and rushed to Helen Joseph Hospital in Johannesburg where he was pronounced dead on Tuesday noon of May 28, 2013.  Controversies arised when reports concerning the cause of his death came out, some reports suggested that that he died from alcohol intoxication while other reports suggested that he died from drug overdose. Both suggestions left unsolved puzzle concerning the actual cause of Mangweha's death. He was laid to rest on June 3, 2013 at Kihonda in Morogoro Region, Tanzania.

References

1982 births
2013 deaths
Tanzanian rappers
Swahili-language singers
21st-century Tanzanian male singers
Tanzanian musicians
Tanzanian Bongo Flava musicians